The administrative divisions of Henan, a province of the People's Republic of China, consists of prefecture-level divisions subdivided into county-level divisions then subdivided into township-level divisions.

Administrative divisions
All of these administrative divisions are explained in greater detail at administrative divisions of China. This chart lists only prefecture-level and county-level divisions of Henan.

Recent changes in administrative divisions

Population composition

Prefectures

Counties

References

Further reading 
 Ministry of Civil Affairs of the People's Republic of China, ed. Administrative Divisions Booklet of the People's Republic of China, 2006 (《中华人民共和国行政区划简册—2006》). Beijing: China Cartographic Publishing House, 2006.

 
Henan